Lindsay Phillips Muscato (born December 7, 1984) is an American entrepreneur. Muscato is the creator and founder of TELETIES, a hair tie company. Previously, Muscato served as president of CEO of Lindsay Phillips, a shoe and accessories company exclusively for women.

Biography
Muscato was born in Clearwater, Florida on Dec 7, 1984. Her father, Paul Phillips, is a cardiologist and her mother, Liz Phillips, worked as a nurse.
Muscato attended Berkeley Preparatory School in Tampa, Florida. It was during this time that Lindsay developed the concept for sandals that would eventually lead her to launch SwitchFlops - interchangeable flip-flops with removable straps to match any outfit. Encouraged by the favorable responses she received after creating ceramic flips flops – part of an art class project – she began expanding her vision by toying with the idea of creating colorful straps and buttons that could diversify the look of just one pair of flip flops. She soon realized that by using hook-and-loop fasteners, her vision of “Change Your Look, Not Your Sole” was complete. By the end of her high school career, Phillips applied for a patent. In 2017, Lindsay Muscato created TELETIES, an all-in-one hair tie that doubles as a stylish stackable bracelet. Today, TELETIES is a global lifestyle brand best known for its strong-grip, no-rip hair ties that gives back.

Following graduation from Berkeley Prep in 2003, she attended Rollins College in Winter Park, Florida, interning with Ralph Lauren Corporation in New York City during two of her summer breaks. She also attended Semester at Sea, a shipboard, global study abroad program, during which she simultaneously studied and toured several countries including Venezuela, Brazil, South Africa, the Republic of Mauritius, Myanmar, India, Vietnam, China, and Japan. Muscato has frequently commented that her travels abroad have greatly influenced her designs. She graduated in 2007 with a BA in Art History and a minor in communications.

Career
Muscato’s career began in high school with an idea she developed in an art class. In 2004, Phillips received her patent, and with the help of her mother Liz, began searching for a manufacturer. In January 2007, Phillips debuted her SwitchFlops product at the Surf Expo Trade Show in Orlando, Florida. Phillips has since expanded her company to include other footwear, as well as accessories like bags and scarves. Her shoes and accessories have been featured in several publications including  Everyday with Rachel Ray, People Magazine (Style Watch Edition), Star, InStyle, Us Weekly, Woman's World, Redbook, and The New York Times. Her products have also been featured on The View, The Martha Stewart Show, and Good Morning America.

Muscato has donated to the Mammogram Voucher Program at Morton Plant Hospital, the Young Survival Coalition, and a donor’s choice campaign. She has also won several awards, including the Stevie Award for Best Entrepreneur(2009), the Women’s Leadership Exchange 2009 Biz Wiz Award, the Ernst & Young Entrepreneur of the Year Award(2010), and a Rollins College’s Young Alumni Achievement Award (2012).

In 2017, Muscato created TELETIES, an all-in-one hair tie that doubles as a stylish stackable bracelet. With each TELETIES purchase, a donation is made to FORCE, a non-profit organization that aims toward improving the lives of people and families affected by hereditary breast, ovarian and related cancers.

References

1984 births
Living people
People from Clearwater, Florida
American women in business
Women inventors
21st-century American women